Yokley is a surname. Notable people with the surname include:

Darryl Yokley (born 1982), American tenor and alto saxophonist, composer, and music conservatory teacher
Eddie Yokley (born 1952), American politician

See also
Cokley